Channel 27 refers to several television stations:

Canada
The following television stations operate on virtual channel 27 in Canada:
 CHNB-DT-3 in Moncton, New Brunswick
 CIII-DT-27 in Peterborough, Ontario
 CKVU-DT-2 in Victoria, British Columbia

Philippines
 DWDB-TV, the flagship television station of GTV Channel 27 in Metro Manila, Philippines

See also
 Channel 27 virtual TV stations in the United States
For UHF frequencies covering 548-554 MHz:
 Channel 27 TV stations in Canada
 Channel 27 TV stations in Mexico
 Channel 27 digital TV stations in the United States
 Channel 27 low-power TV stations in the United States

27